Har de puttet noget i kaffen? is the fourteenth album released 1987 by the Danish rock band Gnags.

Track listing 
 Den dejligste morgen — 4:38
 Et kys i solen — 4:33
 Elskende i natten — 3:25
 Den blå mikrofon — 3:38
 Skinne som et juletræ — 4:20
 Som et fyrtårn ved havet — 4:48
 Hun letted låget på hans kikkert — 4:03
 En aften med blinkende stjerner — 4:12
 Dengang jeg var dreng — 3:55
 Jeg elsker dig — 2:55
 Rita's rock'n'roll band (remix) — 4:45

References

1987 albums
Gnags albums